"The Comic Book Store Regeneration" is the fifteenth episode of the eighth season of The Big Bang Theory, which first aired on CBS on February 19, 2015.  It is the 174th episode overall. "The Comic Book Store Regeneration" is dedicated to Carol Ann Susi, who played Howard's mother, Debbie Wolowitz.

Plot
Barry Kripke stops by to thank Amy for helping him with her ideas on string theory, which bothers Sheldon because she never helped him out when he was working on it. He complains to Penny who tells him to "let it go". Instead, Sheldon reveals that Amy was secretly performing experiments on Penny and Leonard and comparing the results with those of a chimpanzee, infuriating Penny. Leonard and Raj run into Nathan Fillion (playing himself) at a deli, but he denies he is an actor so he can eat in peace. Later, he admits who he is and offers to take a selfie with them. Raj asks so many questions to verify Fillion's identity that he looks annoyed in the photo. Stuart has opened his new comic book store, which impresses everyone except Howard who finds him using the den furniture that his mother had given him. However, all arguments end when Howard gets a call from Florida where his mother is visiting, and receives news that she died in her sleep. Everyone, including Sheldon who knows how it feels to lose a family member, goes to comfort Howard. After he and Bernadette leave for Florida, the rest of the gang remember and toast the passing of Mrs. Wolowitz, calling her "a loving mother to all of them".

Reception
Schedeen of IGN gave the episode a rating of 8.2 out of 10. Schedeen stated; "The Big Bang Theory delivered an awkwardly structured but emotional farewell to the late Mrs. Wolowitz." Kyle Fowle of The AV Club  gave the episode a B rating.

References

External links

2015 American television episodes
The Big Bang Theory episodes